Gumma is a village and Community Development Block in the Gajapati District of Odisha state in India.The Block comes under the administrative control of Serango Police station.
The Block had a population of 72,808 in 2020 census.
Paralakhemundi (Odisha Vidhan Sabha constituency) (Sl. No.: 137) is its Vidhan Sabha constituency.This constituency includes Gumma block, Kashinagar block, Paralakhemundi block.

References

Villages in Gajapati district